Articles (arranged alphabetically) related to the Democratic Republic of the Congo include:

0-9 
 1960 independence
 2005 Lake Tanganyika earthquake

A 
 Aba, DR Congo
 Abacost
 ABAKO
 Abumonbazi Nature Reserve
 AC Sodigraf
 Administrative divisions of the Democratic Republic of the Congo
 African Fiesta
 Agence nationale de renseignements
 Ahmat Acyl
 Air Congo
 Air Kasai
 Air Tropiques
 Air Zaïre
 Aka (Pygmy tribe)
 Albertine Rift montane forests
 Alliance of Democratic Forces for the Liberation of Congo
 Alliance of the Presidential Majority
 Alur language
 Alur people
 Álvaro I of Kongo
 American School of Kinshasa
 Angolan miombo woodlands
 Armed Forces of the North
 Army for the Liberation of Rwanda
 Aruwimi River
 AS Dragons
 AS Kabasha
 AS Vita Club
 Atlantic Equatorial coastal forests
 Atoki Ileka
 Authenticité (Zaire)
 Avokaya language
 Avukaya

B 

 Baka (Cameroon and Gabon)
 Bambuti mythology
 Banana, Democratic Republic of the Congo
 Banda people
 Bandalungwa
 Bandundu Airport
 Bandundu Province
 Bandundu, Democratic Republic of the Congo
 Bangala language
 Bangassou
 Bangoka International Airport
 Banyamulenge
 Baringa
 Barumbu
 Basankusu Airport
 Basankusu
 Bas-Congo
 Bas-Uele District
 Battle of Fada
 Battle of Maaten al-Sarra
 Belgian Congo general election, 1960
 Belgian Congo
 Bemba language
 Bemba people
 Bembe people
 Beni, North Kivu
 Bikoro
 Bili Forest
 Bili-Uere Hunting Reserve
 Bills
 Blue Mountains (Congo)
 Boende
 Bolenge
 Boma Airport
 Boma, Democratic Republic of the Congo
 Bondo, Democratic Republic of the Congo
 Borkou-Ennedi-Tibesti Prefecture
 Boulevard du 30 Juin
 Boyoma Falls
 Bravo Air Congo
 Brazzaville
 Bukavu
 Bumba, Democratic Republic of the Congo
 Bumbu
 Bundu dia Kongo
 Bunia Airport
 Bunia
 Burundi
 Bushimaie Hunting Reserve
 Business Aviation
 Buta, Democratic Republic of the Congo
 Butembo

C 
 Cabinda Province
 .cd
 Cassava production in the Democratic Republic of the Congo
 Central African Republic
 Central Bank of the Congo
 Central African mangroves
 Central Congolian lowland forests
 Central Zambezian miombo woodlands
 Centre National d'Appui au Développement et à la Participation populaire
 Chadian Armed Forces
 Chadian National Armed Forces
 Chadian-Libyan conflict
 Chromium
 Coat of arms of the Democratic Republic of the Congo
 Cobalt
 Codos
 Colonial heads of Congo
 Colonisation of the Congo
 Comazar
 Communes of Kinshasa
 Communications in the Democratic Republic of the Congo
 Compagnie Africaine d'Aviation
 Congo Airlines
 Congo Crisis
 Congo Express
 Congo Free State
 Congo-Kinshasa at the 1968 Summer Olympics
 Congo Pedicle
 Congo Railroad
 Congo Reform Association
 Congo River
 Congolese Association Football Federation
 Congolese franc
 Congolese hip hop
 Congolese National Movement–Lumumba
 Congolese Rally for Democracy
 Congolian rainforests
 Constitution of the Democratic Republic of the Congo
 Constitutional Court of the Democratic Republic of the Congo
 Copper mining
 Copper
 Copperbelt
 Coupe du Congo (DR Congo)
 Court of Cassation (Democratic Republic of the Congo)
 Cuisine of the Democratic Republic of the Congo
 Culture of the Democratic Republic of the Congo
 Cuvette Centrale
 Cyangugu
 Congo-Brazzaville (Republic of the Congo)

D 
 Daring Club Motema Pembe
 DC Virunga
 Debout Congolais
 DEMIAP
 Democratic Confederation of Labour (DRC)
 Democratic Forces for the Liberation of Rwanda
 Democratic Republic of the Congo
 Democratic Republic of the Congo at the 2000 Summer Olympics
 Democratic Republic of the Congo at the 2004 Summer Olympics
 Democratic Republic of the Congo at the 2008 Summer Olympics
 Democratic Republic of the Congo at the 2012 Summer Olympics
 Democratic Republic of the Congo at the 2016 Summer Olympics
 Democratic Republic of the Congo constitutional referendum, 2005
 Democratic Republic of the Congo general election, 2006
 Democratic Republic of the Congo gubernatorial elections, 2007
 Democratic Republic of the Congo Senate election, 2007
 Democratic Social Christian Party
 Demographics of the Democratic Republic of the Congo
 Depara
 Diamonds
Didiba
 Djokupunda
 DR Congo national football team
 Dungu, Democratic Republic of the Congo

E 
 Early Congolese history
 East African mountains
 East Sudanian savanna
 Eastern Congolian swamp forests
 Eastern Rift Valley
 Ebola River
 Economy of the Democratic Republic of the Congo
 Education in the Democratic Republic of the Congo
 Efé
 Eglise de Jésus-Christ
 Eglise du Christ au Congo
 Ekosso
 Elections in the Democratic Republic of the Congo
 Embassy of the Democratic Republic of Congo in Ottawa
 Episcopal Baptist
 Équateur
 Équateur Province
 Eric Lenge

F 
 FC Saint Eloi Lupopo
 Federalist Christian Democracy-Convention of Federalists for Christian Democracy
 Fédération des Scouts de la République démocratique du Congo
 Fiafed
 Fimi River
 First Congo War
 Fizi
 Flag of the Democratic Republic of the Congo
 Flight Express
 Fondation chirezi
 Force Publique
 Forces for Renewal
 Foreign policy of Mobutu Sese Seko
 Foreign relations of the Democratic Republic of the Congo
 French Congo
 French language
 FROLINAT
 Fwa River

G 
 Gabon
 Gangala-na-Bodio Hunting Reserve
 Garamba National Park
 Garanganze people
 Gbadolite
 Gbadolite Agreement
 Gbadolite Airport
 Gécamines
 Gemena
 Gemena Airport
 General Confederation of Labour of the Congo
 Geography of the Democratic Republic of the Congo
 Gisenyi
 Goma
 Goma International Airport
 Government of the Democratic Republic of the Congo
 Grand Kalle
 Grand Kalle et l'African Jazz
 Grand Kalle et l'African Jazz
 Great Lakes refugee crisis

H 
 Haut-Katanga (proposed province)
 Haut-Lomami (proposed province)
 Haut-Uele (proposed province)
 Heads of state of the Congo Free State
 Heads of state of the Democratic Republic of the Congo
 Hema people
 Hewa Bora Airways
 History of the Democratic Republic of the Congo
 House of Kinlaza
 Hunde language
 Hutu
 HVDC Western Power Corridor

I 
 Identity Pieces
 Idjwi
 Ikela
 Ilebo
 Ilebo Airport
 Ilunga
 Independent Electoral Commission (DRC)
 Inga Dam
 Inga Falls
 Inga-Shaba
 Inkisi River
 Inongo Airport
 Isiro
 Islam in the Democratic Republic of the Congo
 ISO 3166-2:CD
 Itombwe Nature Reserve
 Ituri conflict
 Ituri Province
 Ituri Rainforest

J 
 João I of Kongo

K 
 Kahuzi-Biéga National Park
 Kakwa people
 Kalamu (Kinshasa)
 Kalemie Airport
 Kaliko
 Kama Sywor Kamanda
 Kamina
 Kananga
 Kananga Airport
 Kanda Bongo Man
 Kano Accord
 Kaonde language
 Kasai Province
 Kasai region
 Kasai River
 Kasai-Occidental
 Kasai-Oriental
 Kasai-oriental Province
 Kasa-Vubu (commune)
 Kasumbalesa
 Katanga Plateau
 Katanga Province
 Katangan franc
 Kengo Wa Dondo
 Khonvoum
 Kikwit
 Kikwit Airport
 Kiliba
 Kimbanseke
 Kindu
 Kindu Airport
 King Leopold's Ghost
 Kingdom of Loango
 Kinshasa
 Kinshasa Airways
 Kinshasa Highway
 Kinyarwanda
 Kipushi
 Kiri Airport
 Kirundi
 Kisangani
 Kisantu
 Kisula Ngoy
 Kitona
 Kituba language
 Kivu
 Kivu Air
 Kivu conflict
 Kole Sur Lukenie Airport
 Kole, Democratic Republic of the Congo
 Kolwezi
 Kolwezi Airport
 Kongo Central
 Kongo language
 Kongo people
 Kongo University
 Konono N°1
 Kuba Kingdom
 Kundelungu National Park
 Kwango Province
 Kwango River
 Kwassa kwassa
 Kwilu Province

L 
 La Gombe (Kinshasa)
 La Zaïroise
 Lake Albert
 Lake Chamo
 Lake Edward
 Lake Kivu
 Lake Mai-Ndombe
 Lake Mweru
 Lake Tanganyika
 Lake Tshangalele
 Lake Tumba
 Lamba, Democratic Republic of the Congo
 Languages of the Democratic Republic of the Congo
 Law enforcement in the Democratic Republic of the Congo
 Leki (singer)
 Lendu
 Leopold II of Belgium
 Les Quatre Etoiles
 LGBT rights in the Democratic Republic of the Congo (Gay rights)
 Libenge
 Lignes Aeriennes Congolaises
 Likasi
 Linafoot
 Lingala language
 Lisala
 List of African writers (by country)#Congo
 List of airports in the Democratic Republic of the Congo
 List of amphibians of the Democratic Republic of the Congo
 List of birds of the Democratic Republic of Congo
 List of cities in the Democratic Republic of the Congo
 List of Congolese films
 List of ecoregions in the Democratic Republic of the Congo
 List of governors of Kinshasa
 List of governors of the Banque Centrale du Congo
 List of mammals of the Democratic Republic of the Congo
 List of political parties of the Democratic Republic of the Congo
 List of prime ministers of the Democratic Republic of the Congo
 List of protected areas in the Democratic Republic of the Congo
 List of provincial governors of the Democratic Republic of the Congo
 List of television stations in Kinshasa
 List of volcanoes in the Democratic Republic of the Congo
 Livingstone Falls
 Lodja
 Lodja Airport
 Lofoi Falls
 Logo people
 Lol Mohamed Shawa
 Lomako-Yokokala Nature Reserve
 Lomami National Park
 Lomami Province
 Lomami Province (former)
 Lomami River
 Loningisa
 Lualaba Province
 Lualaba River
 Luapula River
 Luba people
 Lubaland
 Lubondai
 Lubu River
 Lubumbashi
 Lubumbashi International Airport
 Lufira Biosphere Reserve
 Lufira River
 Lugbara language
 Lugbara mythology
 Lukaya River
 Lulonga River
 Lulua Province
 Lunda Empire
 Lunda language
 Lunda people
 Luo Scientific Reserve
 Luvua River

M 
 Madiaba
 Maiko National Park
 Mai-Mai
 Mai-Ndombe Province
 Malift Air
 Malloum's military government
 Manganese
 Mangbetu people
 Mangroves National Park
 Maniema
 Maniema Province
 Masina (Kinshasa)
 Matadi
 Matadi Bridge
 Matadi-Kinshasa Railway
 Matari Airport
 Mbandaka
 Mbandaka Airport
 Mbanza-Ngungu
 Mbo language (Congo)
 Mbomou River
 Mbuji Mayi Airport
 Mbuji-Mayi
 MIBA Aviation
 Middle Congo
 Military of the Democratic Republic of the Congo
 Missa Luba
 Mitumba Mountains
 Moba port
 Mobaye-Mbongo
 Mobayi-Mbongo
 Mobutism
 Mobutu Sese Seko
 Moise Tshombe
 Mokele-mbembe
 Mongala Province
 Les mongoles
 Mono language (Congo)
 Mont Ngafula
 Mount Karisimbi
 Mount Nyamuragira
 Mount Nyiragongo
 Mount Sabyinyo
 Mount Stanley
 Mouvement National Congolais
 Mouvement National Congolais-Kalonji
 Movement for the Liberation of Congo
 Mpinga Kasenda
 Muanda
 Muanda Airport
 Mulungwishi
 Munga Mibindo
 Murara
 Music of the Democratic Republic of the Congo
 Musumba
 Mutamba Milambo
 MV Liemba
 Mwadi Mabika
 Mwata Yamvo
 Mwene-Ditu
 Mwindo epic
 Myra Ndjoku Manianga

N 
 N'djili Airport
 National Alliance of Democrats for Reconstruction
 National Alliance Party for Unity
 National Assembly of the Democratic Republic of the Congo
 National Road No. 2 (Democratic Republic of the Congo)
 National Union of Congolese Workers
 Nationalist and Integrationist Front
 Negue Djogo
 Ngaliema
 Ngiri Triangle Nature Reserve
 Ngoyo
 Niemba
 Nioki Airport
 Nkutu
 Nomad and National Guard
 Nord-Kivu
 Nord-Kivu Province
 Nord-Ubangi
 Nord-Ubangi Province
 Northeastern Congolian lowland forests
 Northern Congolian forest–savanna mosaic
 Nsi Kwilu
 Nsumbu Mazuwa
 Nsundi
 Ntumba Luaba
 Nyanga language
 Nyanga-li language
 Nyangwe
 Nzanga Mobutu

O 
 Office National des Transports (Congo)
 OK Jazz
 Okapi Wildlife Reserve
 Ol Doinyo Lengai
 Olivier Kamitatu Etsu
 Opération Épervier
 Operation Manta
 Operation North Night Final
 Orientale Province
 Oscar Kashala
 Ota Benga
 Ouadi Doum air raid

P 
 Panzi Hospital
 Papi Kimoto
 Parliament of the Democratic Republic of the Congo
 Patrice Lumumba
 People's Armed Forces
 People's Armed Forces of Congo
 People's Party for Reconstruction and Democracy
 Pierre Mulele
 Pierre Pay-Pay wa Syakasighe
 Politics of the Democratic Republic of the Congo
 Pool Malebo
 Popular Movement of the Revolution
 Prefecture Apostolic of Welle
 President of the Democratic Republic of the Congo
 Pretoria Accord
 Prime Minister of the Democratic Republic of the Congo
 Provinces of the Democratic Republic of the Congo
 Public holidays in the Democratic Republic of the Congo
 Pygmies
 Pygmy music

Q

R 
 Rain forest
 Rassemblement Démocratique pour le Rwanda
 Republic of the Congo
 Réserve Abumonbazi
 Rift Valley lakes
 Roger Lumbala
 Roman Catholic Archdiocese of Bukavu
 Roman Catholic Archdiocese of Kananga
 Roman Catholic Archdiocese of Kinshasa
 Roman Catholic Archdiocese of Kisangani
 Roman Catholic Archdiocese of Lubumbashi
 Roman Catholic Archdiocese of Mbandaka-Bikoro
 Roman Catholicism in the Democratic Republic of the Congo
 Rulers of Kuba
 Rutshuru
 Ruwenzori Range
 Rwenzori–Virunga montane moorlands
 Ruzizi River
 Rwanda

S 
 Sake, DRC
 Salonga National Park
 Sangha River
 Sango language
 Sankuru Nature Reserve
 Sankuru Province
 Sankuru River
 Second Congo War
 Semliki River
 Senate of the Democratic Republic of the Congo
 Shaba I
 Shaba North
 Shaba Province
 Shinkolobwe
 Siege of Jadotville
 Société nationale d'électricité (SNEL)
 Soukous
 South Kasai
 Southern Congolian forest–savanna mosaic
 Special Presidential Division
 Stade de Virunga
 Stade des Martyrs
 Stade Municipal de Lubumbashi
 Stade Municipal de Vita Kabasha
 Stade Tata Raphaël
 Stairs Expedition to Katanga
 Sudan
 Sud-Kivu
 Sud-Kivu Province
 Sud-Ubangi Province
 Sumba (Congo)
 Sun City Agreement
 Swankton, DRC

T 
 Tagbu
 Tanganyika District
 Tanganyika Province
 Tanzania
 Territories of the Democratic Republic of the Congo
 Tetela language
 Thangata
 The Rumble in the Jungle
 Théophile Mbemba Fundu
 Thysville Caves
 Tim Biakabutuka
 Tippu Tip
 Toubou
 Toyota War
 TP Mazembe
 Trans Service Airlift
 Transitional Government of National Unity
 Transitional Government of the Democratic Republic of the Congo
 Transitional National Assembly of the Democratic Republic of the Congo
 Transport in the Democratic Republic of the Congo
 Tshela
 Tshikapa
 Tshikapa Airport
 Tshiluba language
 Tshimpi Airport
 Tshombe Airport
 Tshopo Province
 Tshuapa Province
 Tumba-Lediima Nature Reserve
 Tumba-Ngiri-Maindombe
 Twa peoples

U 

 Ubangi River
 Ubundu
 Uele River
 Uganda
 Unified Lumumbist Party
 Union for Democracy and Social Progress (Democratic Republic of the Congo)
 Union for the Republic National Movement
 Union Minière du Haut Katanga
 Union of Congolese Patriots
 Union of Federalists and Independent Republicans
 United Nations Mission in the Democratic Republic of Congo
 United Nations Operation in the Congo
 United States Ambassador to the Democratic Republic of the Congo
 University of Goma
 University of Kinshasa
 University of Kisangani
 University of Lubumbashi
 Upemba Depression
 Upemba National Park
 Uranium
 Uvira

V 
 Velours du Kasaï
 Vice Presidents of the Democratic Republic of the Congo
 Vicky Longomba
 Victoria Basin forest–savanna mosaic
 Virunga Mountains
 Virunga National Park
 Vital Kamerhe
 Vivi, Democratic Republic of the Congo
 Volcan Army
 Volcan Rumoka

W 
 Wendo Kolosoy
 Western Congolian forest–savanna mosaic
 Western Congolian swamp forests
 Wildlife of the Democratic Republic of the Congo
 Willy Kalombo Mwenze
 Wimbi Dira Airways
 Wochua

X

Y 
 Yaka people
 Yambuku
 Yangambi Biosphere Reserve
 Yeke Kingdom
 Yulu people

Z 
 Zaiko Langa Langa
 Zaire
 Zaire at the 1984 Summer Olympics
 Zaire at the 1988 Summer Olympics
 Zaire at the 1992 Summer Olympics
 Zaire at the 1996 Summer Olympics
 Zairean zaire
 Zairian Socialist Party
 Zambezian flooded grasslands
 Zambia
 Zande language
 Zinc
 Zola Matumona
 Zongo
 .zr
 Zyoba

References

See also 

 Lists of country-related topics - similar lists for other countries

 
Congo (Kinshasa)